Mahon is an unincorporated community in Marshall County, Mississippi, United States.

History
A post office called Mahon was established in 1890, and remained in operation until 1919. The community was named for John Mahon.

The population in 1900 was 41.

References

Unincorporated communities in Marshall County, Mississippi
Unincorporated communities in Mississippi